Sala Klang is one of the nine subdistricts (tambon) of Bang Kruai District, in Nonthaburi Province, Thailand. The subdistrict is bounded by (clockwise from north) Bang Yai, Bang Muang, Plai Bang, Sala Thammasop and Sala Ya subdistricts. In 2020 it had a total population of 20,057 people.

Administration

Central administration
The subdistrict is subdivided into 6 administrative villages (muban).

Local administration
The whole area of the subdistrict is covered by Sala Klang Subdistrict Municipality.

References

External links
Website of Sala Klang Subdistrict Municipality

Tambon of Nonthaburi province
Populated places in Nonthaburi province